Statistics of Swiss Super League football (soccer) competition in the 1966–67 season.

Overview
There were 14 teams contesting in the 1966–67 Nationalliga A and Basel finished the seasons as champions just one point clear of both FC Zürich in second position and FC Lugano who finished third. Basel won 16 of the 26 games, drawing eight, losing twice, and they scored 60 goals conceding just 20. FC Moutier finished in last position and were relegated.  FC Winterthur and FC La Chaux-de-Fonds finished level on points and thus played a relegation play-out. La Chaux-de-Fonds won 3–1 and Winterthur were also relegated.

Basel also won the Swiss Cup. In the Cup final Basel's opponents were Lausanne-Sports. In the former Wankdorf Stadium on 15 May 1967, Helmut Hauser scored the decisive goal via penalty. The game went down in football history due to the sit-down strike that followed this goal. After 88 minutes of play, with the score at 1–1, referee Karl Göppel awarded Basel a controversial penalty. André Grobéty had pushed Hauser gently in the back and he let himself drop theatrically. Subsequent to the 2–1 for Basel the Lausanne players refused to resume the game and they sat down demonstratively on the pitch. The referee had to abandon the match. Basel were awarded the cup with a 3–0 forfait. Basel won the double for the first time in the club's history.

League standings

Results

References

Sources
 Switzerland 1966–67 at RSSSF

Swiss Football League seasons
Swiss
1966–67 in Swiss football